Al-Musannah Sports City, also known as Millennium Resort Mussanah, is a large hotel belonging to Millennium & Copthorne Hotels, in Al-Musannah, Oman. The 2010 Asian Beach Games were held there.

References

Sports venues in Oman
Sports venues completed in 2010